Chloris cubensis is a species of grass native to the islands of the Caribbean.  It has been collected in Cuba, Puerto Rico, the Virgin Islands, Jamaica, Antigua, Barbados, and Guadeloupe. Common name in English is Cuban windmill grass.

References

cubensis
Grasses of North America
Flora of Cuba
Flora of Jamaica
Flora of Puerto Rico
Flora of Guadeloupe
Flora of Barbados
Plants described in 1936
Taxa named by A. S. Hitchcock
Flora without expected TNC conservation status